This was the first edition of the tournament.

Guido Andreozzi won the title after defeating Nicolás Kicker 4–6, 6–4, 6–2 in the final.

Seeds

Draw

Finals

Top half

Bottom half

References

External links
Main draw
Qualifying draw

Challenger Temuco - 1